In the North American legal system and in US Occupational Safety and Health Administration regulations, willful violation or willful non-compliance is a violation of workplace rules and policies that occurs either deliberately or as a result of neglect.

Definition 
Willful violation is defined as an "act done voluntarily with either an intentional disregard of, or plain indifference to," the requirements of Acts, regulations, statutes or relevant workplace policies. This is described with slightly different emphasis in an OSHA technical manual that a "willful violation exists under the Act where the evidence shows either an intentional violation of the Act or plain indifference to its requirements."

Criminal recklessness is similarly described in Black's Law Dictionary as "Conduct whereby the actor does not desire harmful consequence but...foresees the possibility and consciously takes the risk," or alternatively as "a state of mind in which a person does not care about the consequences of his or her actions."

See also

  ("guilty act")
 
 
 
 
 
 
 
 
 
 
 
 
 
 
 
 
 
 
  ("guilty mind")
 
 
 
 
 
 
 
 
 
 
  (also called "willful ignorance" or "contrived ignorance")

References

American legal terminology
Law of negligence